Sorting nexin-21 is a protein that in humans is encoded by the SNX21 gene.

This gene encodes a member of the sorting nexin family. Members of this family contain a phox (PX) domain, which is a phosphoinositide binding domain, and are involved in intracellular trafficking. This protein does not contain a coiled coil region, like some family members. The specific function of this protein has not been determined. Multiple transcript variants encoding distinct isoforms have been identified for this gene.

References

Further reading